This article describes the qualification for the 2012 European Men's Handball Championship.

Qualification system

Seeding 
The draw for the qualification round was held on 31 January 2010 at the EHF headquarters, in Vienna, Austria. Serbia (host nation), and France (defending champion), were directly qualified.
39 teams (including Serbia) had registered for participation. 37 teams competed for 14 places at the final tournament in 2 distinct Qualification Phases. In each phase, the teams were divided into several pots according to their positions in the EHF National Team Ranking list valid for the EHF EURO 2012 Qualification in Serbia.

Seeding for Qualification Phase 1

Seeding for Qualification Phase 2
The seedings were completely known after the playing of the final week-end of the 2010 European Men's Handball Championship.

Playing dates
Qualification Phase 1:
Two options were available:
 Tournaments: 11–13 June 2010
 Home and away round robin: 14/15 April 2010, 17/18 April 2010, 9/10 June 2010, 12/13 June 2010, 16/17 June 2010, 19/20 June 2010

Tiebreakers
If two or more teams are equal on points on completion of the group matches, the following criteria are applied to determine the rankings.
 Higher number of points obtained in the group matches played among the teams in question.
 Superior goal difference from the group matches played among the teams in question.
 Higher number of goals scored in the group matches played among the teams in question.
 If, after applying criteria 1) to 3) to several teams, two or more teams still have an equal ranking, the criteria 1) to 3) will be reapplied to determine the ranking of these teams. If this procedure does not lead to a decision, criteria 5), 6) and 7) will apply.
 Superior goal difference from all group matches played.
 Higher number of goals scored in all group matches played.
 Drawing of lots.

Qualification Phase 1 
The participating teams were the 12 lowest ranked according to the EHF National Team Ranking list valid for the EHF EURO 2012 Qualification in Serbia. 
The 12 teams divided into 3 groups, with the 3 winners advancing to the Qualification Phase 2.

Draw procedure 
The remaining team went to pot 3 (the balls were not opened).
 Step 2: 3 teams of pot 1 to row 1
 Step 3: 3 teams of pot 2 to row 2
 Step 4: 3 teams of pot 3 to row 3
 Step 5: 3 teams of pot 4 to row 4

Group 1
Venue: Crystal Palace National Sports Centre, London

Group 2
Venue: Tbilisi Sports Palace, Tbilisi

Group 3
Venue: Centre National Sportif d'Coque, Luxembourg

Qualification Phase 2 
There were 28 teams participating at this phase. They were drawn into 7 groups of 4 teams with the first 2 in each group qualifying for the 2012 European Men's Handball Championship. The teams participating at this phase were:

Group 1

Group 2

Group 3

Group 4

Group 5

Group 6

Group 7

References

External links
 Eurohandball Site

Qualification
Europe Men's Championship qualification
Europe Men's Championship qualification
Qualification for handball competitions